Before The Backstreet Boys 1989–1993 is the unofficial, independently released demo album released by Backstreet Boys member Nick Carter. The songs were recorded by Nick from 1989 to 1993. The song "Hard to Get" was written by Mark J. Dye for Carter and his former singer partner, Malia Tuaileva. Tuaileva appears in a duet on the album and singing solo on the album with the track, "Mansion In Malibu".

Track listing
"Summer!" 3:33
"Love Is a Wonderful Thing"
"More Today Than Yesterday"
"Hard to Get" (duet with Malia Tuaileva)
"Rhythm of My Heart" 3:16
"Runaround Sue"
"Lights"
"Breaking Up Is Hard to Do" 
"Just a Gigolo" / "I Ain't Got Nobody" 4:30
"Jailhouse Rock"
"God Bless the U.S.A." 3:12
"Uptown Girl"
"Rockin' Around the Christmas Tree"
"Mansion in Malibu" (Malia solo)
"The Star-Spangled Banner"
"Hard to Get" (Nick solo version)
"Sunday Morning Bells" 2:45

External links
Album page on CD Baby

Nick Carter (musician) albums
2002 compilation albums